gobbinjr, the stage name of musician Emma Witmer, is an American indie pop musician from New York City.

History
Emma Witmer grew up in Wisconsin. Emma Witmer began releasing music as a student at New York University. Witmer released her first full-length album titled Manalang on Yellow K Records. In 2016, Witmer released her first EP titled vom night. In 2018, Witmer released her second full-length album and first on the record label Topshelf Records.

Discography
Studio albums
Manalang (2015, Yellow K Records)
Ocala Wick (2018, Topshelf Records)

EPs
Vom Night (2016)

References

American women singer-songwriters
Musicians from Wisconsin
New York University alumni
Living people
Year of birth missing (living people)
American indie pop musicians
Singer-songwriters from New York (state)
Topshelf Records artists
21st-century American women